Nadine Emilie Voindrouh or simply Nadine (born February 24, 1977) is a Romanian singer, actress and television presenter. She is of Congolese descent through her father.

She was born in Bucharest to a Romanian mother who died when she was young and a Congolese father, whom she never met.

Nadine was orphaned when she was only six years old, and lived in an orphanage. She lived in the United States seven years.

Filmography

References

External links 

1977 births
Romanian actresses
Romanian television presenters
Living people
Actresses from Bucharest
Romanian expatriates in the United States
Romanian people of Democratic Republic of the Congo descent
21st-century Romanian singers
21st-century Romanian women singers
Romanian women television presenters